Case “Jezus redt” was a Dutch lawsuit between Joop van Ooijen and Giessenlanden municipality.

Van Ooijen initially had a banner with the text Jezus Leeft on his property but to make the message visible from a nearby highway he painted “Jezus redt” (Jesus Saves) on the roof of his farmstead. Giessenlanden municipality demanded he remove the text to comply with the “Woningwet” on pain of a fine. Eventually Van Ooijen went to the Council of State, claiming his religious freedom was threatened. The council ruled against him so he decided to go to the European Court of Human Rights.

The lawsuit became very famous in the Netherlands. Dakevangelist became the third most popular word in the Van Dale’s election for the lifestyle word of the year. Van Ooijen later led the political party Jezus Leeft.

References 

European Court of Human Rights cases involving the Netherlands
Molenlanden
Christianity in the Netherlands